Micralarctia punctulatum is a moth of the family Erebidae. It was described by Hans Daniel Johan Wallengren in 1860. It is found in Angola, Botswana, Cameroon, the Democratic Republic of the Congo, Eritrea, Ethiopia, Ghana, Kenya, Malawi, Mozambique, Namibia, Niger, Nigeria, Senegal, South Africa, Tanzania, Gambia, Uganda, Zambia and Zimbabwe.

The larvae have been recorded feeding on Ipomoea batates.

Subspecies
Micralarctia punctulatum punctulatum (Botswana, Malawi, Namibia, Zimbabwe)
Micralarctia punctulatum auricinctum (Butler, 1897) (Angola, Democratic Republic of the Congo, Kenya, Malawi, Mozambique, Tanzania, Uganda, Zambia)
Micralarctia punctulatum euproctina (Aurivillius, 1899 [1900]) (Angola, Cameroon, Ghana, Niger, Nigeria, Senegal, South Africa, Tanzania)
Micralarctia punctulatum pura (Butler, 1878) (Democratic Republic of the Congo, Eritrea, Ethiopia, Kenya, Tanzania, Uganda)

References

Spilosomina
Moths described in 1860
Moths of Sub-Saharan Africa